Hugh the Great (c.898–956) was Duke of the Franks.

Hugh the Great or Hugh Magnus may also refer to:
Hugh Capet (939–996), first Capetian king of France
Hugh, Margrave of Tuscany (950–1001), margrave of Tuscany and duke of Spoleto
Hugh Magnus (1007–1025), co-king of France, son of Robert II of France
Hugh of Cluny (1024–1109), saint
Hugh, Count of Vermandois (1053–1101), son of Henry I of France and one of the leaders of the First Crusade
Hugh III of Cyprus (1235–1284), king of Cyprus and Jerusalem